The Hayden Homes Amphitheater is an outdoor amphitheater  built in the historic Old Mill District in Bend, Oregon. The amphitheater's name-in-title sponsor is Hayden Homes, a Central Oregon home builder. The venue was formerly named the Les Schwab Amphitheater, after a Central Oregon businessman.

Opened in 2002, the venue accommodates approximately 8,000 people for concerts and other events in a casual outdoor setting.

Overview

The venue was built in 2001 and opened the next year as the Les Schwab Amphitheater, after the Central Oregon businessman who founded the tire retail chain also carrying his name.

Artists that have performed at the amphitheater include Coldplay, Willie Nelson, the Beach Boys, Crosby, Stills & Nash, Jack Johnson, the Pixies, ZZ Top, Paul Simon, AFI, The Flaming Lips, Fiona Apple, Wilco, Beck, Bob Dylan, The Shins, Tenacious D, the Dave Matthews Band, Phish, Portugal. The Man, John Legend, My Morning Jacket, 311, Khruangbin, the Chicks, Norah Jones, "Weird Al" Yankovic, and Jim Gaffigan. The venue has also hosted events such as Bend Brewfest. 

The venue was one of four finalists selected in the 2016 Sunset Magazine Awards in the "Best Outdoor Music Venue" category, which honors a Western theater, amphitheater or other outdoor concert site for constantly delighting music lovers.

In 2020, the venue was upgraded to accommodate larger productions. It re-opened for the 2021 concert season with new seating areas and a modified design for improved viewing.

In November 2021, the amphitheater was renamed the Hayden Homes Amphitheater after a Central Oregon-based home builder established in Redmond in 1989, after it had been a longtime supporter of the venue. According to developer of the Old Mill District Bill Smith, "Hayden Homes shares the same values we do. We named the venue after Les Schwab the man for 20 years, to honor his contribution to helping build the Old Mill District. Hayden Homes builds and invests in this community ... Passing the torch to Hayden Homes feels right."

Economic impact
A 2015 research study found that the Hayden Homes Amphitheater impacts the Central Oregon economy in the following ways:

 125,000 visitors to the venue brought in an estimated 27 million dollars of revenue to the region
 Among the out-of-town visitors, 75 percent said they came specifically for the concert.
 The average length of stay for out-of-town concert attendees was 3.4 nights with 74 percent staying in Bend lodging accommodations, and the remaining 26 percent divided between surrounding communities of Redmond, Sunriver and Sisters.
 Total concert-related spending in the Central Oregon area was estimated to be nearly $19 million, spent on dining, shopping, lodging, recreation, groceries, gas stations, and a variety of other services.
 Total trip-related spending by out-of-town visitors attracted to Bend specifically to attend the concert series was $16 million.

References

External links

Amphitheaters in the United States
Music venues in Oregon
Buildings and structures in Bend, Oregon
Tourist attractions in Bend, Oregon
Culture of Bend, Oregon
2001 establishments in Oregon
Music venues completed in 2001